Rush Green is a hamlet on the outskirts of Hertford , Hertfordshire. The Roman road Ermine Street passed through Rush Green.

Location
It is next to the Foxholes and Pinehurst housing estates, and bridges the gap between Hertford Heath and Hertford.

Roundabout
The A10 road passes by, and is connected by the Rush Green roundabout.

Since the closure of McDonald's in Hertford Town Centre, Rush Green now contains the only McDonald's in Hertford.

References

Hamlets in Hertfordshire
Geography of Hertford
East Hertfordshire District